The Sleep of Reason is the tenth book in C. P. Snow's Strangers and Brothers series.

Plot synopsis
Lewis Eliot returns to his home town during the trial of two young women for murder. Eliot and his generation strive to understand the society of the 1960s.

Reception
In a 1968 book review in Kirkus Reviews summarized the book as; "Snow's approach is as massively ceremonious as ever. Each character is introduced by an organ chord of commentary: thoughts are as long as life; characters from other books are prodded into being. But there is a certain dogged majesty in this far exit as Snow lumbers down the halls of power."

References

1968 British novels
English novels
Novels by C. P. Snow
British political novels
Macmillan Publishers books